Stelian Anghel (7 March 1952 – 23 November 2009) was a Romanian former footballer who played as a forward. He was also president at Politehnica Timișoara.

International career
Stelian Anghel played two games at international level for Romania, making his debut in a 1–0 away loss against Bulgaria at the 1973–76 Balkan Cup. His second game was a 2–2 against Iran.

Honours
Metrom Brașov 
Divizia C: 1971–72
Politehnica Timișoara 
Divizia B: 1983–84
Cupa României: 1979–80

References

External links

Romanian footballers
Romania international footballers
Association football forwards
1952 births
2009 deaths
Liga I players
Liga II players
FC Brașov (1936) players
FC Politehnica Timișoara players
Romanian sports executives and administrators